Batha Est (or Batha East) is one of the three departments which make up the Batha Region in Chad. The capital is Oum Hadjer.

Sub-prefectures 
Batha Est is divided into four sub-prefectures:

 Oum Hadjer 
 Assinet 
Haraze Djombo Kibet 
Am Sack

See also
 Regions of Chad

References

Departments of Chad
Batha Region